Hierodula simbangana is a species of praying mantis in the family Mantidae.

Hierodula simbangana is endemic to New Guinea.

References

simbangana
Articles created by Qbugbot
Insects described in 1912